Cosmoclostis parauxileuca is a moth of the family Pterophoridae. It is found in Guangdong, China.

References
 , 2004: First record of the genus Cosmoclostis Meyrick from China, with descriptions of two new species (lepidoptera: Pterophoridae). Acta Zootaxonomica Sinica 29 (1): 142-146.

Moths described in 2004
Pterophorini